Automatic braking may refer to:

Automobiles
 Autonomous emergency braking, known as AEB, is a collision avoidance system which engages the main braking system in automobiles when it detects an imminent collision
 Emergency brake assist, known as EBA, which increases braking effectiveness when a human driver executes a panic stop
 Anti-lock braking system, which maximizes braking friction on slippery surfaces or during an emergency braking maneuver
 A feature of an autonomous cruise control system (ACC), when the vehicle ahead is too close
 Brake-by-wire

Other vehicles
 Train protection system, which engages an emergency brake in dangerous situations
 Autobrake, a system for automating braking during takeoff and landing of airplanes